WZYX (1440 AM) is a radio station that broadcasts an adult hits format branded as "The Eagle". It is licensed to Cowan, Tennessee, United States. The station is owned by Christopher Thomas Wiseman, through licensee Wiseman Media. WZYX Radio is broadcast over the AM dial at 1440, and over the FM dial via translators at 94.5 and 95.3.

Staff includes Al Clark, General Manager, Marie Trotter, Administrative Assistant, Jeff Pennington, On Air Personality/Sales, Brian Crisp, News Reporter and Keaton Solomon - Salesperson/Production Assistant 

Shows include Rise n Shine 5-6 AM with Jeff Pennington M-F, Sunday Morning Church Services with Keaton 8-12 PM, You Outta Know on Wednesdays and Fridays 11AM-1PM.

The Noon hour is dedicated to school news, church news, chamber happenings, market news, etc. Higgle and Haggle airs at 12:35-12:45 PM M-F. 
The Community Shopper show airs every Saturday Morning at 10 AM and Tuesday Morning at 8AM.

Church Programming includes:
8 AM Power and the Glory
8:30 AM Midway Church of Christ - Keith Hamilton, Evangelist
9:00 AM Old Time Religion - Beech Hill Baptist Church - Troy Deaton, Pastor
9:30 AM Sun, 1 PM M-F International Gospel Hour with Jeff Archey
10:00 AM Decherd Christian Tabernacle Church
10:30 AM Decherd First United Methodist Church - Jerry Broome and John Neal
11:00 AM - Worship Service at First United Methodist Church Winchester

External links
WZYX Radio Facebook

ZYX
Radio stations established in 1992
Franklin County, Tennessee